Random Family: Love, Drugs, Trouble, and Coming of Age in the Bronx is a 2003 narrative non-fiction study of urban life by American writer Adrian Nicole LeBlanc.

Summary
The book, LeBlanc's first, took more than 10 years to research and write. Random Family is a nonfiction account of the struggles of two women and their family as they deal with love, drug dealers, babies and prison time in the Bronx. LeBlanc began the long period of research after reporting on a piece in Newsday about the trial of "a hugely successful heroin dealer" named Boy George.

Reception
Random Family was enthusiastically received by critics.  In The New York Times, critic Janet Maslin described LeBlanc's work as "a book that exerts the fascination of a classic, unflinching documentary." Mark Kramer, director of the Nieman Foundation Program on Narrative Journalism at Harvard University, praised the book's "relentless neutrality."<ref>Amy Farley, In the Family Way," Village Voice, January 28, 2003.</ref> In The New York Times Book Review, Margaret Talbot wrote, "The conventional compliment to pay a work of narrative nonfiction is to say that it's 'novelistic' or that it 'reads like fiction.' You could certainly say that of 'Random Family,' and yet there are tasks a writer like LeBlanc must accomplish that are different, and in some ways more difficult, than a novelist's. For one thing, she must remain cleareyed about people to whom she owes a tremendous debt of gratitude for admitting her into the intimacies of their lives. And for another, she must hew to a plotline that is often stuttering and circular and decidedly lacking in resolution. None of the people she writes about veer definitively toward a newer or better life — they tend toward the same tired grooves — yet she makes their stories riveting"; Talbot called LeBlanc's work, "An extraordinary book."

Awards and honors
LeBlanc and Random Family garnered several awards and nominations. Her research methods earned her a spot among several other journalists and nonfiction writers in Robert Boynton's book, The New New Journalism.'' In 2006, LeBlanc received a MacArthur Fellowship, more popularly known as a "Genius Grant".

References

External links
Adrian Ncole LeBlanc on NPR about Random Family
Robert S. Boynton in The New Journalism on Adrian LeBlanc and Random Family
The New York Times Book Review on Random Family
Boy George website, including LeBlanc's reporting of Random Family
Adrian Nicole LeBlanc website

2003 non-fiction books
Books about New York City
Books about education
Books about the Bronx